A piggyback basin (also piggy-back, thrust-sheet-top, detached, or satellite basin) is a minor sedimentary basin developed on top of a moving thrust sheet as part of a foreland basin system. Piggyback basins form in the wedge-top depositional zone of a foreland basin system as new thrusts in the foreland cut up through the existing footwall containing the eroded wedge-top basins in the old thrust sheet. The basin is separated from the foredeep by an anticline or syndepositional growth structures. The piggyback basin is named after its tendency to be carried passively toward the hinterland with the old thrust sheet in response to the compressive forces of the new thrust sheet. Sedimentary fill for the basin come from the hanging wall ramp of the older thrust sheet, from the foreland orogeny or from the sides of the basin. Drainage into the basin may come from highs associated with the thrust sheets or the basin may be filled from longitudinal flows across the basin.

The Po Basin of Italy and the Ebro Basin of Spain were the example basins used to initially describe the tectonics and occurrence of piggyback basins. The Tannheim-Losenstein basin in the Eastern Alps is also a piggyback basin system.

See also

References

Allen, Philip A. and Allen, John R. (2005) Basin Analysis: Principles and Applications, 2nd ed., Blackwell Publishing, 549 pp.
Encyclopedia of Geomorphology, Andrew Goudie (Editor), Routledge, 2013

Basins
Sedimentology
Tectonics